Wurtsboro Hills is a hamlet (and census-designated place) in the town of Mamakating in Sullivan County, New York, United States. The hamlet is located along old NY 17, west of the Village of Wurtsboro. The telephone exchange is primarily 888 and along with 647 in Area Code 845. The hamlet consists of over 100 bungalows, primarily constructed from the 1920s to the 1960s.

History

The Wurtsboro Hills Owners Association was formed in the second decade of the 20th century, by Charles Tuxhill, a local real estate developer. WHOA constructed a gas station, a concrete community pool, and a baseball field. Therein existed one natural spring and water from the abundant aquifer behind the pool. At one time, the pool was a water sports club open only to the Association members. In 1948, Tuxhill had the small lake dug out from three streams flowing into it. 
Wurtsboro Hills was a bustling summer hamlet from the late 1920s to the mid-1970s, with many Irish and Italian families from New York City staying there. The bungalows were supplied water from the township from Memorial Day to Labor Day. There was a local store called The Pantry from the mid-1970s to the early 2000s. Other local landmarks were Curcio's Tavern and a world-famous French restaurant called La Mingotiere. With the advent of cheap air travel, the summertime tourism faded and all these landmarks are gone. The one landmark still surviving is at the entrance of the hills is the Hunting Lodge. In March 2022, the Hunting Lodge was bought and became Sullivan House Bar and Grill.

Geography
The community is divided into three hills. 
The highest elevations are on Stoney Trail at 1186 feet above sea level on the first hill and PeeWee trail at 1437 on the third hill.

References 

Hamlets in New York (state)
Hamlets in Sullivan County, New York